Mirror, Mirror II: Raven Dance is a 1994 American horror film produced, co-written, and directed by Jimmy Lifton, and starring Tracy Wells, Roddy McDowall, Sally Kellerman, Veronica Cartwright, and Mark Ruffalo. A sequel to Mirror, Mirror (1990), its plot follows a teenage orphan who finds herself haunted by a mysterious mirror inside the Catholic orphanage she is living in.

The film was released directly-to-video in May 1994. It marked actor Mark Ruffalo's feature film debut.

Cast
Tracy Wells as Marlee
Roddy McDowall as Dr. Lasky
Sally Kellerman as Roslyn
Lois Nettleton as Sister Marion
Veronica Cartwright as Sister Aja
William Sanderson as Roger
Mark Ruffalo as Christian
Carlton Beener as Jeffrey
Sarah Douglas as Nicolette

Release
Anchor Bay Entertainment released Mirror, Mirror II: Raven Dance on DVD on October 24, 2000. On March 9, 2004, Anchor Bay re-released the film on DVD as part of a four-film set featuring all of the films in the Mirror, Mirror series.

Critical response
Joe Bob Briggs wrote of the film: "Nine dead bodies. Multiple blinding. One raven attack. Mirror licking. Table-saw to the back. Arm hacking. Gratuitous demon that goes by so fast you can blink and miss it. Spider Fu. Drive-In Academy Award nominations for Tracy Wells, as the bimbo in peril, for saying "Does God hate me? Am I cursed?" and "My whole life is dancing."" In his book The Horror Show Guide, Mike Mayo wrote: "The effects are the only thing this one has going for itself. They range from a guy in a silly rubber suit to some really good, inventive work done with lights at computers."

References

External links

1994 horror films
1994 films
Direct-to-video horror films
American supernatural horror films
American sequel films
1990s English-language films
1990s American films